Ragogna is a comune (municipality) in the Province of Udine in the Italian region Friuli-Venezia Giulia, located about  northwest of Trieste and about  northwest of Udine.

Ragogna borders the following municipalities: Forgaria nel Friuli, Pinzano al Tagliamento, San Daniele del Friuli.

Twin towns
Ragogna is twinned with:

  Weitensfeld im Gurktal, Austria, since 2003
  Sainte-Bazeille, France, since 2010

References

Cities and towns in Friuli-Venezia Giulia